Algerian may refer to:
 Something of, or related to Algeria
 Algerian people, a person or people from Algeria, or of Algerian descent
 Algerian cuisine
 Algerian culture
 Algerian Islamic reference
 Algerian Mus'haf
 Algerian (solitaire)
 Algerian (typeface)

See also 
 
 Languages of Algeria
 List of Algerians

Language and nationality disambiguation pages